Nattavaara is a minor locality in Gällivare Municipality, Norrbotten County in the province of Lapland in Sweden. The settlement had a permanent population of 114 as of the year 2015. That is also the nearest urban area, with Jokkmokk being slightly further away to the southwest. The only paved roads are to the north and the east, whereas the Jokkmokk road transitions into a gravel road just west of the village.

The settlement has a station on the rail line between Stockholm and Narvik in Nordland, Norway. Adjacent to the small village is the even smaller settlement of Nattavaara by.

Climate
Nattavaara has a subarctic climate (Köppen Dfc) typical of central Lapland. Winters can sometimes fall below  and are among the coldest in terms of Swedish locations with weather stations.

Images

References

Populated places in Gällivare Municipality
Populated places in Arctic Sweden